Deuterated dimethylformamide ((CD3)2NCOD), also known as deuterated DMF, is an isotopologue of DMF ((CH3)2NCOH) in which the hydrogen atom ("H") is replaced with a deuterium isotope ("D"). Deuterated DMF is a relatively uncommon solvent used in NMR spectroscopy.

References

Deuterated solvents